Mary Caswell Orr (December 21, 1910 – September 22, 2006) was an American actress and author whose short story "The Wisdom of Eve", published in the May 1946 issue of Cosmopolitan, was the basis of the Academy Award-winning film All About Eve (1950). In private life, Orr used her married name, Mary Orr Denham.

Early life
Orr was born in Brooklyn, New York. She and her family relocated to Canton, Ohio when she was a girl. She studied at Syracuse University and the American Academy of Dramatic Arts in Manhattan.

Career
According to Orr's obituary in the New York Times, "The Wisdom of Eve" was loosely based upon an unnamed woman who had been the secretary of Viennese actress Elisabeth Bergner. Orr wrote a radio adaptation that aired on NBC in 1949,  and that led to the movie being made. While she did not receive screen credit for All About Eve (she had sold the story to Twentieth Century Fox for $5,000), she did receive a Screen Writers Guild award for her original story.

An alternative hypothesis to the Ruth Hirsch (later known as Martina Lawrence)-Elizabeth Bergner origin was the rivalry between Tallulah Bankhead and Lizabeth Scott (her understudy) during the production of Thornton Wilder's The Skin of Our Teeth.  Broadway legend had it that Bankhead was being victimized by Scott, who was,  supposedly, the real-life Eve Harrington.

In 1964, Orr and her husband, director-playwright Reginald Denham, adapted the short story into a play of the same name, which was produced off-Broadway in 1979.  In 1970, a hit Broadway musical, Applause, was based on All About Eve and gave a credit to Mary Orr for the original story.  She wrote a sequel to "The Wisdom of Eve" titled "More About Eve," which was published in Cosmopolitan in July 1951.

In addition to Applause, Mary Orr and Reginald Denham had four plays that opened on Broadway. Their first and most successful, Wallflower, ran for 192 performances in 1944. Round Trip was presented in 1945, while Dark Hammock started its performances in 1946. The fourth, Be Your Age, made its Broadway appearance in 1953. She also acted in Broadway plays, including two of her own: Wallflower and Dark Hammock. The film version of Wallflower was released in 1948.

Alone or with her husband, Orr wrote five books and forty television scripts.

Death
Orr died of pneumonia in Manhattan in 2006, aged 95. She was predeceased by her husband, who died in 1983.

Works 

 Diamonds in the Sky (1957)
 A Place to Meet (1961)
 The Tejera Secrets (1974)
 Rich Girl, Poor Girl (1975)
 Lucky Star (1986)

References

External links
 

1910 births
2006 deaths
20th-century American actresses
20th-century American dramatists and playwrights
20th-century American novelists
20th-century American short story writers
American Academy of Dramatic Arts alumni
American stage actresses
Deaths from pneumonia in New York City
Novelists from New York (state)
People from Brooklyn
Syracuse University alumni
21st-century American women